Omana Kunjamma was India's first female magistrate. Kunjamma was born in the village of Thikkurissy, Nagercoil (then a part of Travancore, now in Nanchilnadu, Nagercoil, Kanyakumari district, Tamil Nadu), in an aristocratic Malayalee Nair family, to Mangat C. Govinda Pillai and N. Lekshmi Amma.

Kunjamma is the elder sister of Malayalam actor Thikkurissy Sukumaran Nair.

References

Year of birth missing (living people)
Living people
Indian women lawyers
Women of the Kingdom of Travancore
People of the Kingdom of Travancore
Women in Tamil Nadu politics
People from Nagercoil
20th-century Indian lawyers
Scholars from Tamil Nadu
20th-century women lawyers